Mirjana Živković (1935, Split-2020, Belgrade) was a Serbian composer, musicologist and longtime professor at the Faculty of Music, University of Arts in Belgrade. She was a member of the Serbian Composers' Association, and her compositions include Summer Night. She published two text books on music, Harmony II and Instrumental Counterpoint and is the joint author of Krađa kulturnog i nacionalnog blaga Jugoslavije (Beograd : NIU "Vojska" ; Gornji Milanovac : NIP "Dečje novine", 1995).

References

External links

1935 births
2020 deaths
20th-century classical composers
Serbian composers
Women classical composers
20th-century women composers
Serbs of Croatia
Musicians from Split, Croatia